Sulfadoxine (also spelled sulphadoxine) is an ultra-long-lasting sulfonamide used in combination with pyrimethamine to treat malaria.

It is also used to prevent malaria but due to high levels of sulphadoxine-pyrimethamine resistance, this use has become less common.

It is also used, usually in combination with other drugs, to treat or prevent various infections in livestock.

Mechanism of action
Sulfadoxine competitively inhibits dihydropteroate synthase, interfering with folate synthesis.

See also
 Sulfadoxine/pyrimethamine

References

Anilines
Ethers
Pyrimidines
Sulfonamide antibiotics
Dihydropteroate synthetase inhibitors
Antimalarial agents